Bois Forte Band of Chippewa (Ojibwe language: Zagaakwaandagowininiwag, "Men of the Thick Fir-woods"; commonly but erroneously shortened to Zagwaandagaawininiwag, "Men of the Thick Boughs") are an Ojibwe Band located in northern Minnesota, along the border between the United States and Canada. Their landbase is the Bois Forte Indian Reservation, of which the Nett Lake Indian Reservation holdings are the largest of their reservation holdings. The Bois Forte Band is one of six constituent members of the Minnesota Chippewa Tribe. In 2007, the Minnesota Chippewa Tribe reported having 3,052 people enrolled through the Bois Forte (Nett Lake) Reservation as members of the Bois Forte Band.

History

The Bois Forte Band is an amalgamation of three separate groups, of which the Zagwaandagaawininiwag was the largest component, also known on some documents as Zoongaatigwitoonag ("Strong-wooded Ones", reflected in French as "Les Songatikitons"). Others now considered part of the Bois Forte Band includes the Lake Vermilion Band of Lake Superior Chippewa and the southern half of the Little Forks Band of Rainy River Saulteaux. Due to their very peaceful existence, Warren reports they were called the "Rabbit" (Ojibwe language: Waabooz). Under the Treaty of Paris (1783) and the Webster-Ashburton Treaty (1842), the Little Forks Band of Rainy River Saulteaux were divided in half, with the southern half living about the Little Fork River being in the United States. The Lake Vermilion Band went into a treaty relationship with the United States in 1854. In 1866, the Bois Forte Band entered into a treaty with the United States, which also began the amalgamation process of these three historical bands into a single Band of today.

Ethnonyms
The Bois Forte Band are named after their location of thick conifer forest of northern Minnesota. Handbook of North American Indians record other variations of their names.

 Boise Forte — Indian Affairs Report, 332, 1873.
 Bois Forts — Warren (1852) in Minnesota Historical Society Collections, V, 85, 1885.
 Hardwoods — Warren (1852) in Minnesota Historical Society Collections, V, 85, 1885.
 Sagantwaga-wininiwak — Gatschet, Ojibwa Manuscript. BAE 1882
 Sagwandagawinini — Baraga, English-Otchipwe Dictionary, 109, 1879
 Sạgwāndạgāwininiwạg — William  Jones, information, 1905.
 Sakâwiyiniw — Baraga, English-Otchipwe Dictionary, 109, 1879
 Sug-wau-dag-ah-win-in-e-wug — Warren (1852) in Minnesota Historical Society Collections, V, 85, 1885.
 Sug-waun-dug-ah-win-ine-wug — Warren in Schoolcraft, Indian Tribes, II, 139, 1852
 Sug-wun-dug-ah-win-in-e-wug — Ramsey in Indian Affairs Report, 90, 1850.
 Thick Woodsmen — Warren in Schoolcraft, Indian Tribes, II, 139, 1852
 Waub-ose — Warren (1852) in Minnesota Historical Society Collections, V, 86, 1885.

Band-owned businesses and enterprises
The band operates the Nett Lake Wild Rice cooperative, owns and operates the Powerain carwash products, Fortune Bay Resort and Casino, WELY AM & FM in Ely, Minnesota, and KBFT FM in Nett Lake, Minnesota.  It established a credit union, Northern Eagle Federal Credit Union, in 2013.

Notable Bois Forte citizens
 Joe Geshick, artist
 Linda LeGarde Grover, University of Minnesota, Duluth, American Indian Studies professor and Duluth Budgeteer columnist, author of The Dance Boots (2010)
 Keith Secola (b. 1957), musician, singer

References

Further reading
 Vollom, Judith L. and Thomas M. Vollom. Ojibwemowin: Series II. (Elk River, MN: Merlin J. Willams Sr. and Tom Vollom, 2002). — Language lessons of the Bois Forte dialect of the Ojibwe language, interspersed with cultural history of the Band.

External links
 Official website of the Bois Forte Band
 People of the Thick Fir Woods

Ojibwe governments
Native American tribes in Minnesota
Native American history of Minnesota
St. Louis County, Minnesota
Minnesota Chippewa Tribe